Terence Trent D'Arby's Vibrator* (*Batteries Included) is the fourth album by Terence Trent D'Arby, released in 1995 on Columbia Records. It was self-written, produced, and arranged, and features the single "Holding On to You", which peaked at number 20 on the UK Singles Chart.

Critical reception

Select gave the album a rating of one out of five, finding the album derivative of  Prince, Jimi Hendrix, Rod Stewart and Marvin Gaye." Music journalist James Richliano stated that the set is made up of musical gems, in which D'Arby reveals himself to be a lover and a poet, whose "rich, soulful voice immediately seizes the ear." In 2020, marking the album's 25th anniversary, Andy Healy said it "may not have been packed with quantifiable hits, but it is undeniably welcoming and enjoyable."

Track listing
"Vibrator" – 5:43
"Supermodel Sandwich" – 3:32
"Holding On to You" – 5:44
"Read My Lips (I Dig Your Scene)" – 4:49
"Undeniably" – 4:59
"We Don't Have That Much Time Together" – 4:40
"C.Y.F.M.L.A.Y?" – 4:04
"If You Go Before Me" – 3:44
"Surrender" – 4:56
"TTD's Recurring Dream" – 5:31
"Supermodel Sandwich W/Cheese" – 3:59
"Resurrection" – 6:25
"It's Been Said" – 4:10

Charts

References

External links
Sananda Maitreya's Official Site Includes a more detailed discography

1995 albums
Terence Trent D'Arby albums
Columbia Records albums